Javid Taghiyev (born 6 October 1981, in Lankaran) is a retired boxer from Azerbaijan.

He participated in the 2004 Summer Olympics for his native European country. There he was stopped in the second round of the Middleweight (75 kg) division by Thailand's eventual bronze medalist Suriya Prasathinphimai.

Taghiyev won the bronze medal in the same division six months earlier, at the 2004 European Amateur Boxing Championships in Pula, Croatia.

After retiring from boxing, Taghiyev moved to Iraq, where he professionally trains local boxers.

External links

Yahoo! Sports

1981 births
Living people
Azerbaijani male boxers
Middleweight boxers
Boxers at the 2004 Summer Olympics
Olympic boxers of Azerbaijan
People from Lankaran